Disequilibrium is the lack of or opposite of an equilibrium.

Economics
 lack of economic equilibrium
 General disequilibrium 
 Disequilibrium (economics)

Medicine
 Disequilibrium (medicine) (DES), a syndrome in cerebral palsy  
 lack of equilibrioception
 Dialysis disequilibrium syndrome

Political science
 Status-income disequilibrium

Population genetics
 Linkage disequilibrium, the non-random association of alleles at two or more loci, not necessarily on the same chromosome

Thermodynamics
 Disequilibrium (thermodynamics)